Water Valley High School may refer to:
Water Valley High School (Texas)
Water Valley High School (Mississippi)